Handleyomys rhabdops, also known as the highland oryzomys or striped rice rat, is a species of rodent in the genus Handleyomys of family Cricetidae. It is nocturnal and is found in Guatemala and Mexico in montane forest at elevations from 1250 to 3250 m.

References

Literature cited
Musser, G. G. and M. D. Carleton. 2005. Superfamily Muroidea. pp. 894–1531 in Mammal Species of the World a Taxonomic and Geographic Reference. D. E. Wilson and D. M. Reeder eds. Johns Hopkins University Press, Baltimore.

 

Rodents of Central America
Mammals of Mexico
Handleyomys
Mammals described in 1901
Taxonomy articles created by Polbot
Taxa named by Clinton Hart Merriam